St Thomas College of Arts and Science, popularly known as "St. Thomas College", is a Christian college in Chennai, India. It offers Bachelors and Masters level degree programmes  and is affiliated to the University of Madras. It is also a recognized educational institution by the government of Tamil Nadu.

Origin
The St. Thomas College was established in September 1999, under the initiative and guidance of HG Dr. Yakob Mar Irenaios, Metropolitan of Madras of the Malankara Orthodox Church of India, who motivated the  members of the St. Thomas Orthodox Cathedral Parish, Broadway, Chennai to form a Parish Trust. HG Dr. Yakob Mar Irenaios served as the Chairman of the Trust from 1999-2009. The first principal of the college was Rev. Dr. Francis Soundararaj, former principal of Madras Christian College, UGC Emeritus Fellow and a Post-Doctoral Fellow in Spoken English from the University of Edinburgh. During the term of the last Principal Dr. Mathuram Selvaraja (2006–2009), the strength of the college rose from 500 in 2005 to over 1800 men and women students by 2009.

The college is established by the St. Thomas Orthodox Cathedral Parish Trust Board consisting of 18 members of the Parish consisting of the Metropolitan of the Madras Diocese of the Indian Orthodox Church (Chairman: ex officio), the Vicar (Vice Chairman: ex officio), Lay Trustees and Secretary of the St. Thomas Orthodox Cathedral Parish, nine members elected by the parish and four members approved by the Board including a lady member. The Secretary  who is the CEO of the Trust and the Treasurer is elected by the Board from time to time. St Thomas Orthodox Cathedral Parish Trust is a registered Public Charitable Trust as per sections 12A and 80G of the Income Tax Act, and is recognised as the educational agency of the St. Thomas College of Arts and Science, as per the Tamil Nadu Private Colleges (Regulation) Act, 1976.

Motto
The motto of St. Thomas College is 'let there be light' (from Genesis 1:3), emphasising the Christian responsibility to share the light with others.

Programs
For all courses offered at the college, the degree is awarded by the University of Madras. A semester pattern with a credit system prescribed by the university is adopted for all the undergraduate and postgraduate courses. The medium of instruction is English. The following courses are available:

UG 
-Shift I
BA English
B.Com General, Bank Management, Accounting and Finance, Corporate Secretaryship.
BBA  Business Administration
BCA  Computer Applications
B.Sc.  Psychology
B.Sc.  Mathematics
B.Sc.  Computer Science
B.Sc.  Electronic Media
B.Sc.  Visual Communication                                                                                                                                                                                                                                                                       PG-Shift IM.Sc.  Visual Communication
M.Sc.  Electronic Media
M.Com.UG 
-Shift II
B.Com General, Bank Management, Accounting and Finance, Corporate Secretaryship.
BBA  Business Administration
BCA  Computer Applications
B.Sc.  Computer Science

Departments

English; Commerce; Business Administration; Computer Science & Applications; Mathematics; Psychology; Visual Communication; Electronic Media; Tamil; Malayalam; Hindi;French

References

External links
Official Website

Arts and Science colleges in Chennai
Colleges affiliated to University of Madras